Esther Salmovitz (born 8 April 1948) is an Israeli lawyer and former politician who served as a member of the Knesset between 1992 and 1996.

Early life
Born in Romania in 1948, Salomvitz made aliyah to Israel in 1950. After high school she studied real estate law, and took Open University course in history of the people of Israel.

Political career
She joined the Tzomet party, and chaired its Nahariya branch. She headed the party in Nahariya city council, and was a member of its Absorption and Education Committee. She was elected to the Knesset on the Tzomet list in 1992. However, on 7 February 1994 she left the party together with Alex Goldfarb and Gonen Segev to form Yiud, which joined Yitzhak Rabin's coalition government. On 27 November 1995 she and Goldfarb left Yiud to establish Atid. They both lost their seats in the 1996 elections, in which the party did not participate.

After leaving politics she completed a BA in law and business administration. In 2007 she was certified as a lawyer and began practicing law.

References

External links

1948 births
Romanian Jews
Romanian emigrants to Israel
Israeli lawyers
Living people
Yiud politicians
Tzomet politicians
Atid (political party) politicians
Women members of the Knesset
Israeli women lawyers
Members of the 13th Knesset (1992–1996)
20th-century Israeli women politicians